Lithops karasmontana subsp. amicorum  is a small desert succulent plant with white flowers. They are usually 10-15 millimeters in diameter. It was named for the group of four friends who discovered it. It was collected by Desmond T. and Naureen A. Cole on 3 May 2004. After recent molecular analysis it has been determined to be a subspecies of Lithops karasmontana rather than its own species.

References

amicorum